Iefke van Belkum (born 22 July 1986 in Leiden) is a water polo player of the Netherlands who represents the Dutch national team in international competitions.

Van Belkum was part of the team that became 10th at the 2005 World Aquatics Championships in Montreal. At the 2006 FINA Women's Water Polo World League in Cosenza and the 2006 Women's European Water Polo Championship in Belgrade they finished in fifth place, followed by the 9th spot at the 2007 World Aquatics Championships in Melbourne. The Dutch team finished in fifth place at the 2008 Women's European Water Polo Championship in Málaga and they qualified for the 2008 Summer Olympics in Beijing. There they ended up winning the gold medal on 21 August, beating the United States 9-8 in the final.

She has played for the Greek clubs Ethnikos Piraeus, where she won the LEN Trophy in 2010, and Olympiacos, where she won the Greek Championship in 2011, scoring 5 goals in the final game of the best-of-five final series.

See also
 Netherlands women's Olympic water polo team records and statistics
 List of Olympic champions in women's water polo
 List of Olympic medalists in water polo (women)
 List of World Aquatics Championships medalists in water polo

References

External links
 

1986 births
Living people
Sportspeople from Leiden
Dutch female water polo players
Water polo centre forwards
Water polo players at the 2008 Summer Olympics
Medalists at the 2008 Summer Olympics
Olympic gold medalists for the Netherlands in water polo
Ethnikos WPC
Olympiacos Women's Water Polo Team players
Dutch expatriate sportspeople in Greece

Ethnikos Piraeus Water Polo Club players
Expatriate water polo players